The Eclipse Award for Champion Older Dirt Female Horse is an American Thoroughbred horse racing honor awarded annually to a filly or mare, four years old and up, for performances on dirt and main track racing surfaces. In 1971, it became part of the Eclipse Awards program as the award for Champion Older Female Horse.

In 1936 both the Turf & Sports Digest magazine and Daily Racing Form (DRF) began naming an annual champion. Starting in 1950, the Thoroughbred Racing Associations (TRA) began naming its own champion. The following list provides the name of the horses chosen by both of these organizations. Whenever there were different champions named, the horses are listed side-by-side with the one chosen as champion by the Daily Racing Form noted with the letters (DRF), the one chosen by the Thoroughbred Racing Associations by the letters (TRA) and the one chosen by Turf and Sports Digest by the letters (TSD).

Prior to 1971 this award was referred to as "Champion Female Handicap Horse" or "Champion Handicap Mare". The Daily Racing Form version was open to any female horse, and was given to some Champions at the age of three, such as Tosmah, Twilight Tear and Busher.

Champions from 1887 through 1935 were selected retrospectively by a panel of experts as published by The Blood-Horse magazine.

In 2015, the Daily Racing Form, the Thoroughbred Racing Associations, and the National Turf Writers Association decided that the award would be renamed and awarded to older female horses proficient in dirt and main track races.

Honorees

Eclipse Award for Champion Older Dirt Female

Daily Racing Form, Turf & Sport Digest and Thoroughbred Racing Association Awards

Daily Racing Form and Turf & Sport Digest Awards

The Blood-Horse retrospective champions

References

 The Eclipse Awards at the Thoroughbred Racing Associations of America, Inc.
 The Bloodhorse.com Champion's history charts
 American Champion Older Female Horse at Thoroughbred Heritage

Horse racing awards
Horse racing in the United States